The Premier League is the main competition in England Roller Hockey. It has a long history, and it has existed since 1930. It has some of the most historic European teams like Herne Bay and Herne Bay United. The top teams usually compete in European Club Competitions like European League or Cers Cup now organised by World Skate Europe - Rink Hockey.

Participating teams: 2019–2020 season
The clubs that are competing in the 2019 - 2020 Season are: Ely and Chesterton United, Grimsby, Herne Bay, King's Lynn, London, Manchester, Middlesbrough, Peterborough and Soham.
The top tier of English rink hockey is the Premier League consisting of 9 teams playing single match home/away format hockey.

History of the Premier League

Number of Championships by Team

National Cup
The National Cup is the second main competition of Roller Hockey in England and is played by all the English clubs.

Number of English Cups by Team

National Division 1
The second tier of English rink hockey is National Division 1. It is played on a tournament basis where teams play twice a tournament, with a total of 10 games in the season. In 2018-19 ECU won the right to move up to the National Premier League, with Herne Bay also making the move up. The clubs that are competing in the National Division 1 2019 - 2020 Season are: Cambridge and Cottenham RHC, Ely & Chesterton Inited RHC, Farnham RHC, Letchworth RHC, RHC Invicta and  Spen Valley Flyers RHC.

The Regions
The next tier of the England Roller Hockey league is split into divisions based in each of the 3 regions. Teams in these divisions play tournaments with points going to their league position.

Northern Counties

List of clubs 
Grimsby RHC, Halifax RHC, Manchester RSC, Middlesbrough, Plymouth RHC, Sheffield Wildcats RH & RSC, Spectrum Spartans RHC and Spen Valley RHC.

Eastern Counties

List of clubs 
Cambridge and Cottenham RHC, Colchester RHC, Ely and Chesterton United RHC, King's Lynn RHC, Letchworth RHC, Norwich City RHC, Peterborough RHC, Skaters RHC, Soham.

South Eastern Counties

List of clubs 
Farnham RHC, Herne Bay RHC, Herne Bay United RH&SC, London RHC, Maidstone RHC, RHC Invicta.

References

External links

English websites
Premier League Results Table 

Roller hockey competitions in England
Roller
National roller hockey championships
Recurring sporting events established in 1930
1930 establishments in England
Professional sports leagues in the United Kingdom